James Charles Floyd (born 20 October 1914) is a British-Canadian retired aeronautical engineer. He became the Avro Aircraft Ltd. (Canada) chief design engineer and his involvement, ultimately as vice-president (engineering), in the design and development of the Avro Canada C-102 Jetliner, Avro Canada CF-100 Canuck and Avro Canada CF-105 Arrow aircraft, occurred during a period which is viewed by many as the "Golden Age" of the Canadian aviation industry.

Early career
Born in Manchester, England, Floyd entered the workplace in January 1930 with an engineering apprenticeship, gained through connections with Roy Dobson, with A.V. Roe and Company in England. Floyd's employment with Avro in England and then Canada reached its peak with his position as Senior Vice President and Director of Engineering at A.V. Roe Canada.

During his early career, Floyd was a design engineer working on the Anson, Manchester, Lancaster, York, Lincoln and Tudor projects at A. V. Roe. He also spent time at Hawkers, another aircraft company in the Hawker Siddeley group. He worked under two British aircraft designers: Roy Chadwick and Sydney Camm. He was later appointed Chief Project Engineer of a special projects group at the Avro Aircraft location in Yorkshire, where he worked on the application of jet engine technology to transport aircraft.

Avro Canada

He moved to Canada to join the new A.V. Roe Canada, more commonly known as Avro Canada, in 1946, and, in 1952, he was named Chief Engineer. He worked on such aircraft as the C102 Avro Jetliner, CF-100 Canuck jet fighter, and the CF-105 Avro Arrow supersonic interceptor, through which he and Canada were recognised as international leaders in aeronautical engineering.

Floyd's work on jet transport in the UK led to the Avro Canada C102 Jetliner. The Jetliner had been designed for a Trans Canada Airlines (TCA) requirement in 1946. Despite being the first jet-powered airliner in North America, and the second to fly worldwide, the Jetliner was never destined to go into production. When the Canadian government insisted that Avro concentrate on its jet engine and CF-100 designs, Floyd was named as Project Designer for the CF-100 in 1952.

Like thousands of other Avro Canada employees, Floyd was laid off in the wake of the Avro CF-105 Arrow/Orenda Iroquois engine cancellation of 20 February 1959, "Black Friday." After securing positions in other companies for many of the engineers in his department, Floyd and his family moved back to England in 1959. He headed up Hawker Siddeley's Advanced Projects Group that developed the HSA.1000 SST design evaluated as part of a joint research study with Bristol whose design ultimately became the Concorde. Floyd later worked as a consultant from 1965 to 1972.

Since his retirement in 1979, Floyd has devoted free time to a number of educational and youth-oriented projects. Floyd and his family returned to Canada in 1981. and, as of 2014, is living in the Greater Toronto area near the site of the now-demolished Avro Canada company buildings in Malton, Ontario.

Honours
In 1950, Floyd was awarded the Wright Brothers Medal from the Society of Automotive Engineers for his paper on the Jetliner (the first non-American recipient); in 1993, he was inducted into the Canadian Aviation Hall of Fame and named a Companion of the Order of Flight by the City of Edmonton. Floyd also was awarded the J.A. McCurdy trophy in 1958 for his work on the Avro Arrow.  In May 2000, he was awarded an Honorary Doctor of Engineering Design by the Royal Military College of Canada.

On 20 July 2009, Floyd was awarded the first Canadian Air and Space Pioneer Award in a ceremony at the former Canadian Air and Space Museum at Downsview Park, Toronto, Canada. He turned 100 in October 2014.

Notes

References

Bibliography

 Floyd, Jim. The Avro Canada C102 Jetliner. Erin, Ontario, Canada: Boston Mills Press, 1986. .
 "Jim Floyd Bio". Avro Arrow Recovery Canada.
 Gainor, Chris. Arrows To The Moon: Avro's Engineers and the Space Race. Burlington, Ontario, Canada: Apogee Books, 2001. .
 Whitcomb, Randall. Avro Aircraft and Cold War Aviation. St. Catharine's, Ontario, Canada: Vanwell Publishing, 2002. .

1914 births
Living people
Canadian centenarians
Engineers from Manchester
English aerospace engineers
Canadian aerospace engineers
Men centenarians
British emigrants to Canada